One Night in Vegas is a 2013 Nigerian comedy drama film directed by John Uche. It stars Jimmy Jean-Louis, John Dumelo, Yvonne Nelson, Sarodj Bertin, Van Vicker, Michael Blackson and Koby Maxwell. The film focuses on a Ghanaian Couple who attempt to better their relationship by taking a trip to Las Vegas. The film was created by the same team who introduced Paparazzi Eye in the Dark in 2011. Budgeted with a low six-figure budget and filmed over the course of 19 days, the film has been known in the Nollywood USA market as the film poised to raise the bar of African films  by utilizing a more western approach to production quality and standards. Notably employing the experience of an American Filmmaker (Tim "Black Magic Tim" Wilson)  to serve as Cinematographer and Editor. The film's official release  in Ghana was one of the largest turnout outs ever in the history of Silverbird Theater in Accra Mall.

The film has played at the United Nations in New York City, The Library of Congress in Washington DC, The Pan African Film Festival, Dublin Ireland, Haiti, Nigeria on July 18, 2014, Maryland, Virginia, California, The United Kingdom, South Africa, and Sierra Leone.

This film was written by Hollywood screenwriter/actor and Atlanta, GA native B.J. Winfrey, who, besides starring on "Army Wives", "Sabotage" with Arnold Schwarzenegger, and Tyler Perry's "The Haves and the Have Nots", also gained notoriety in 2014 for being the first American to win the Nigerian and African Film Critics Award (NAFCA) for the short film "Five".

Plot
James Foster, a man at a crossroads with himself and his marriage. Coming out on top after a high-profile case with a band of thugs; James has been sober for 18 months. He decides a trip to Vegas with his wife Genie would be a good way to rekindle their relationship as well as an opportunity to employ his bodyguard friend, Nick, a few more days as a holiday "thank you" for their security in the case.

Genie's mom, Barbara, is skeptical whether or not the trip will help Genie strengthen her relationship with James or resolve the intimate issues between them. Sometimes weakness is the opposite of strength, but sometimes weakness can be the pathway to strength. Sometimes addiction is the opposite of sobriety, but sometimes addiction can be the pathway to sobriety. Sometimes what happens in Vegas stays in Vegas, but sometimes it doesn't.

Cast
 Jimmy Jean-Louis as Nick
 John Dumelo as James
 Yvonne Nelson as Genie
 Sarodj Bertin as Ashely
 Michael Blackson as Mr. Roland
 Van Vicker as Tony 
 Koby Maxwell as Pat
 Sahndra Fon Dufe as Mildred

Accolades

Nominations 
 2013 NAFC Awards: Best Film in the Diaspora
 2013 NAFC Awards: Best Film
 2013 NAFC Awards: Best Sound
 2013 NAFC Awards: Best Director in the Diaspora
 2013 NAFC Awards: Best Cinematography in the Diaspora
 2013 NAFC Awards: Best Cinematography
 2013 NAFC Awards: Best Actor in a Supporting Role
 2013 NAFC Awards: Best Screenplay
 2013 NAFC Awards: Best Screenplay in the Diaspora
 2013 NAFC Awards: Best Editing
 2013 NAFC Awards: Best Actor in a Leading Role
 2013 NAFC Awards: Best Actress in a Leading Role
 2013 NAFC Awards: Best Visual Effects 
 2013 Ghana Movie Awards: Best Editing/Sound 
 2013 Ghana Movie Awards: Best Music
 2013 Ghana Movie Awards: Best Performance by an Actor in a Supporting Role
 2013 Ghana Movie Awards: Best Picture

Awards 
 2013 NAFCA: Best Cinematography
 2013 NAFCA: Best Film in Diaspora
 2013 NAFCA: Best Actor in a Supporting Role

See also
 List of Nigerian films of 2013

References

External links
 
 

Nigerian independent films
2013 films
Ghanaian independent films
English-language Nigerian films
English-language Ghanaian films
Films set in the United States
2010s English-language films